The Hope and Labour Bloc was a candidature list that contested the May 2005 municipal elections in Bethlehem, the West Bank. The Bloc was launched by a dissident grouping of Fatah, which officially backed the United Bethlehem Bloc. In total, the Hope and Labour Bloc presented 12 candidates. The top candidate of the Bloc was Zughbi Zughbi.

References

External links
Candidate List
Election Programme

Bethlehem municipal election blocs
Defunct political party alliances in the Palestinian territories
Fatah